Edmund "Ted"/"Teddy" Beswick (birth registered July→September 1858 – died 23 January 1911) was an English rugby union footballer who played in the 1870s and 1880s. He played at representative level for England, and Lancashire, and at club level for Swinton, as a Three-quarter, i.e. wing or inside centre. Prior to Tuesday 2 June 1896, Swinton was a rugby union club.

Background
Beswick was born in Penrith, Cumberland, England, and he died aged 52 in Salford, Lancashire, England.

Playing career

International honours
Ted/Teddy Beswick won caps for England while at Swinton in 1882 against Ireland, and Scotland.

County honours
Ted/Teddy Beswick won caps for Lancashire while at Swinton; making his début against Cheshire on Saturday 29 November 1879, and in 1881 he was selected for the North versus the South.

Change of code
When Swinton converted from the rugby union code to the Northern Union code on Tuesday 2 June 1896, Ted/Teddy Beswick would have been approximately 38 years of age. Consequently, he may have been both a rugby union and Northern Union footballer for Swinton.

References

External links
Search for "Beswick" at rugbyleagueproject.org

1858 births
1911 deaths
England international rugby union players
English rugby union players
Lancashire County RFU players
Rugby union players from Penrith, Cumbria
Rugby union three-quarters
Swinton Lions players